Shikiho Sema was an Indian politician. He was a Member of Parliament, representing Nagaland in the Lok Sabha the lower house of India's Parliament as a member of the Indian National Congress.

References

External links
 Official biographical sketch in Parliament of India website

Indian National Congress politicians from Nagaland
Lok Sabha members from Nagaland
India MPs 1989–1991
1946 births
1998 deaths